Zsolt Tiffán (born 1965) is a Hungarian winemaker and politician, member of the National Assembly (MP) for Siklós (Baranya County Constituency VI) from 2010 to 2014, and for Orosháza (Baranya County Constituency IV) from 2014 to 2018.

Tiffán served as President of the General Assembly of Baranya County from 2012 to 2014. He functioned as ministerial commissioner responsible for the Ős-Dráva Program ("Ancient Drava Programme") regional development concept between 14 June 2014 and 15 June 2016.

He became a member of the Committee on Agriculture on May 14, 2010 and Chairman of the Subcommittee for Viticulture and Oenology on May 26, 2010. He was a member of the Economic Committee and Chairman of the Subcommittee on Wine and Gastronomy from 2014 to 2018.

References

1960s births
Living people
Hungarian winemakers
Fidesz politicians
Members of the National Assembly of Hungary (2010–2014)
Members of the National Assembly of Hungary (2014–2018)